Ribersborgsstranden is a neighbourhood of Malmö, situated in the district of Innerstaden, Malmö Municipality, Skåne County, Sweden. It contains the Ribersborgs open-air bath, which opened in 1898 but was destroyed in the Christmas Hurricane of 1902 and had to be rebuilt.

References

Neighbourhoods of Malmö